This is a list of election results for the electoral district of Custance in South Australian elections.

Members for Custance

Election results

Elections in the 1990s

Elections in the 1980s

References

South Australian state electoral results by district